This is a list of sanghas in San Diego County, California, which corresponds to the San Diego-Carlsbad-San Marcos Metropolitan Statistical Area. All major branches of Buddhism, Theravada, Mahayana, and Vajrayana, are represented there, as is the Mahayana form Zen, as are Vipassanā and Jōdo Shinshū (Pure Land). There is also a secular Zen sangha. The area is home to monasteries as well as to less formally engaged groups who gather for meditation and community. Siddhārtha Gautama died over 2500 years ago, but the oldest Buddhist organization in San Diego County is less than 100 years old.

History
During 1916, Japanese immigrant Buddhist farmers were killed when what was then named Otay Dam gave way and resulted in the Hatfield Flood. The local Japanese diaspora needed a place to hold religious services and went on to found what they call the oldest Buddhist organization in San Diego County. They met informally until they were able to afford a temple space. First they rented a second-floor room on 6th and Market in May 1926. Boys and girls in costume paraded through downtown to celebrate. Later, in 1931, they dedicated today's Buddhist Temple of San Diego at 2929 Market.

List

Notes

Religious buildings and structures in San Diego County, California
San Diego
Organizations based in San Diego County, California
Sanghas
San Diego-related lists